The football tournament at the 1996 Summer Olympics started on July 20 and finished on August 3. The women's competition was contested for the first time in Olympic history at these Games.

Stadiums

Medal winners

Men

Women

Match officials
FIFA named 16 referees and 16 assistant referees to be shared between the men's and women's tournaments.

External links

Olympic Football Tournaments Atlanta 1996 – Men, FIFA.com
Olympic Football Tournaments Atlanta 1996 – Women, FIFA.com

 
1996
Summer Olympics 1996